UT3, UT 3 or UT-3 might refer to:

 Unreal Tournament 3
 Utah's 3rd congressional district
 Urea transporter 
 Yakovlev UT-3